Sutanuti was one of the three villages which were merged to form the city of Kolkata (formerly Calcutta) in India. The other two villages were Gobindapur and Kalikata.

See also
 European colonies in India

History of Kolkata
Villages in Kolkata district